Ouzellaguen is a town in northern Algeria. The Béni Mansour-Bejaïa line serves this community.

Communes of Béjaïa Province
Cities in Algeria
Algeria